The Nashville Dixie Flyers were a professional minor league ice hockey team in Nashville, Tennessee. They played in the Eastern Hockey League from 1962 until the franchise folded in 1971. Their home games were held at the Nashville Municipal Auditorium.

Record

References

Defunct ice hockey teams in the United States
Eastern Hockey League teams
Ice hockey teams in Tennessee
Sports in Nashville, Tennessee
1962 establishments in Tennessee
Ice hockey clubs established in 1962
1971 disestablishments in Tennessee
Ice hockey clubs disestablished in 1971